Beringia National Park is on the eastern tip of Chukotka Autonomous Okrug ("Chukotka"), the most northeastern region of Russia.  It is on the western (i.e., Asian) side of the Bering Strait.

Overview
Until 11,000 BCE, the territory of the park was connected by a land bridge – known as "Beringia" – to North America.  On the eastern side, in Alaska, is the Bering Land Bridge National Preserve, operated by the US National Park Service.  There have been talks between the US and Russia about joining the two parks into a cross-border "international park", but as yet nothing has been formalized.   Most of the sparse population in the area are the indigenous Chukchi people or Yupik peoples. The park was formalized as a National Park in 2013.

The park is spread over two districts on the Chukchi Peninsula: Providensky District to the south, and Chukotsky District to the north.   The topography is maritime highland subarctic tundra. The mountains are medium height – averaging 900 meters, with the highest being Mt. Iskhodnaya at 1194 meters.  There are also extensive tundra plains.

Ecoregion and climate
Beringia is in the Bering tundra ecoregion.  The region experiences a Subarctic climate, without dry season (Köppen climate classification Subarctic climate (Dfc)). This climate is characterized by mild summers (only 1–3 months above ) and cold, snowy winters (coldest month below ). January is the coldest month with an average temperature in Anadyr (town) of −22.6 °C (−8.7 °F), and an average temperature of +11.6 °C (52.9 °F) in July.

See also
 Protected areas of Russia

References

External links

 Official website
Map of Indigenous Peoples of the North of the Russian Federation
 Shared Beringian Heritage Program at the US National Park Service

Protected areas established in 2013
National parks of Russia
Bering Strait
Geography of Chukotka Autonomous Okrug
Protected areas of the Russian Far East
Tourist attractions in Chukotka Autonomous Okrug